Primal Scream is the eighth jazz album by Canadian trumpeter Maynard Ferguson on Columbia Records.
Primal Scream marks the beginning of the second phase of Ferguson's career with Columbia, where his live big band sound is set aside in favor of lavish studio productions. The album credits reveal an all-star ensemble made up of New York's finest musicians, along with backing vocalists and strings were recruited for this release.

While most of the tracks would remain studio creations only, his rendition of "Pagliacci" would become a concert feature for his touring band, and was heard by millions when he performed it as part of the closing ceremonies of the 1976 Summer Olympics in Montreal.

Reviews
Maynard's late-'70s recordings were generally not well received by jazz purists, but AllMusic's Jim Newsom described Primal Scream by saying "Ferguson's trademark trumpet playing is featured in all its screaming glory..."

Reissues
In 2004, Primal Scream was reissued by Wounded Bird Records.

Track listing 
All tracks arranged and conducted by Jay Chattaway

Personnel 
All credits adapted from album cover.

Musicians
 Maynard Ferguson: Trumpet

Rhythm
 Drums: Steve Gadd
 Bass: Gary King
 Guitar: Eric Gale, Jeff Mironov, Jerry Friedman
 Percussion: Ralph MacDonald
 Piano, Arp Synthesizer, Clavinet: Bob James
 Electric piano and Mini Moog Synthesizer: Chick Corea ("The Cheshire Cat Walk" only)

Reeds
 Flute and Baritone saxophone: Bobby Militello
 Soprano & Tenor saxophone: Mark Colby
 Alto saxophone: David Sanborn
 Tenor Saxophone: Joe Farrell

Brass
 Trumpet: Marvin Stamm
 Trumpet and Flugelhorn: Jon Faddis, Bernie Glow, Stan Mark
 Trombone: Tony Studd
 Bass trombone: David Taylor, Paul Faulise
 French Horns: Brooks Tillotson, Earl Chapin

Singers
 Patti Austin
 Lani Groves
 Hilda Harris

Strings
 Violins: David Nadien, Max Ellen, Harry Cykman, Paul Gershman, Emanuel Green, Charles Libove, Joseph Malin, Frederick Buldi
 Violas: Theodore Israel, Emanuel Vardi
 Celli: Alan Schulman, Charles McCracken

Production
 Record producer by: Bob James
 Arranged and Conducted by: Jay Chattaway
 Recorded and Mixed by: Joe Jorgenson
 Additional Engineering by: Gerry Block
 Mastering Engineer: Jack Ashkinazy
 Cover Photo: David Arky, John Barrett
 Cover Design: John Berg, Andy Engel

Solos
 All Trumpet: Maynard Ferguson
 Soprano sax solo on Invitation: Mark Colby
 Tenor Sax solo on Primal Scream and Cheshire Cat: Mark Colby
 Synthesizer solo on Cheshire Cat: Chick Corea
 Flute solo on Pagliacci and Swamp: Bobby Militello

References

External links
 

1976 albums
Columbia Records albums
Maynard Ferguson albums